, also called  or  is a rare Shinto shrine architectural style presently found in only three instances, all at Hiyoshi Taisha in Ōtsu, Shiga, hence the name.

It is characterized by a hip-and-gable roof with verandas called hisashi on the sides. It has a hirairi structure, that is, the building has its main entrance on the side which runs parallel to the roof's ridge (non gabled-side). 

The building is composed of a 3x2 ken core called moya surrounded on three sides by a 1-ken wide hisashi, totaling 5x3 ken (see photo). The three-sided hisashi is unique and typical of this style. The gabled roof extends in small porticos on the front and the two gabled sides. The roof on the back has a characteristic shape (see photo below).

See also
 Glossary of Shinto

Notes

Shinto architecture